David Jacobson is an American screenwriter and film director from Van Nuys, Los Angeles, California. His film Down in the Valley was screened in the Un Certain Regard section at the 2005 Cannes Film Festival.

Feature films
 Criminal (1994)
 Dahmer (2002)
 Down in the Valley (2005)
 Tomorrow You're Gone (2012)

References

External links
 
 David Jacobson SuicideGirls - Interview

Living people
Year of birth missing (living people)
American male screenwriters
American film directors